Alexander Johnston Chalmers Skene (17 June 1837 – 4 July 1900) was a British-American gynaecologist from Scotland who described what became known as Skene's glands.

Biography

Skene was born in Fyvie, Scotland, United Kingdom, on 17 June 1837.  At the age of 19, he went to North America. He studied medicine at King's College (now the University of Toronto), then at the University of Michigan, and finally at the Long Island College Hospital (now the State University of New York Downstate Medical Center) in Brooklyn graduating in 1863. From July 1863 until June 1864, he was acting assistant surgeon in the U. S. Army, after which he entered private practice in Brooklyn and advanced to become Professor of Disease of Women at Long Island College Hospital. He was professor of gynaecology in the post-graduate Medical School of New York in 1884, and was president of the American Gynaecological Society.

Skene wrote over 100 medical articles and several textbooks. He contributed many surgical instruments and improved on surgical techniques. He performed the first successful operation of gastro-elytrotomy that is recorded, and also that of craniotomy, using Sims's speculum. Primarily, he is remembered for his description of the Skene's glands at the floor of the urethra. He also described their infection—skenitis. Skene collaborated with J. Marion Sims, who performed gynecologic exams and surgeries on enslaved African-American women without anesthesia, but Skene does not appear to be part of these experiments.

As a sculptor, Skene created a bust of Sims which is on display in the lobby of the Kings County Medical Society. A bust honoring Skene is located in Prospect Park Plaza (also known as Grand Army Plaza). This statue was proposed to be moved in 2011 to accommodate a statue of former U.S. president Abraham Lincoln, but this did not happen.

Skene died in his summerhouse in the Catskills, New York, on 4 July 1900. He left behind a son, Jonathan Bowers. He is buried at Rockland Cemetery in Sparkill, NY.

Works
 Uro-Cystic and Urethral Diseases in Women (New York, 1877)
 Treatise on Diseases of Women, for the Use of Students and Practitioners (1888)

See also
 Paraurethral glands
 Skene's gland

References

Chesley LC: The evolution of the department of obstetrics and gynecology at Downstate 1860–1980. 1981.

External links

 NY Park link

1837 births
1900 deaths
American gynecologists
University of Toronto alumni
University of Michigan Medical School alumni
SUNY Downstate Medical Center alumni
19th-century American inventors
19th-century American sculptors
American male sculptors
United States Army Medical Corps officers
People of New York (state) in the American Civil War
19th-century American male artists